State Route 720 (SR 720) is a  state highway in Churchill County, Nevada, south of Fallon. It serves Naval Air Station Fallon.

Route description

From there, the highway runs due east along Union Lane, a two-lane road which passes through agricultural areas. SR 720 turns to follow the two-lane Pasture Road north another  to an intersection with Cottonwood Drive at the main entrance to NAS Fallon.

History
The alignment of present-day Union Lane appears on maps as early as 1937, although it formerly extended further east prior to the creation of NAS Fallon. By 1957, the roadway existed in its current form albeit without a recognized state highway number, and was fully paved by 1969.

The roadway was first designated as a state highway on July 1, 1976.

Major intersections

See also

References

723
Transportation in Churchill County, Nevada